United States Lightship 101, now known as Portsmouth as a museum ship, was first stationed at Cape Charles, Virginia. Today she is at the Portsmouth Naval Shipyard Museum in Portsmouth, Virginia. Portsmouth never had a lightship station; however, when the vessel was dry docked there as a museum, she took on the pseudonym Portsmouth.  A National Historic Landmark, she is one of a small number of surviving lightships.

History
Lightship Portsmouth (LV-101) was built in 1915 by Pusey & Jones. She first served as Charles in the Chesapeake Bay outside Cape Charles, Virginia from 1916 until 1924. After that assignment Portsmouth served just over a year as the relief ship for other lightships in her district. She was then moved to Overfalls, Delaware, where she was stationed from 1926 to 1951 as Overfalls. In 1939 when the United States Lighthouse Service was absorbed into the United States Coast Guard she was reclassified WAL-524, but still kept a station name on her hull. During World War II the vessel was not armed, however many other lightships were. In 1951 LV-101/WAL 524 was reassigned to Stonehorse Shoal, Massachusetts, where she served until decommissioned in 1963. The lightship then sat in harbor at Portland, Maine, until her fate had been decided.

On 3 September 1964 LV-101 was donated to the City of Portsmouth, Virginia, to become a part of the Portsmouth Naval Shipyard Museum. Portsmouth was dry docked at the London Pier in Portsmouth. Although she was never stationed there, she has taken on the city's name. In 1989, Portsmouth was designated a National Historic Landmark and is open for visitation.

Name and station assignments
Lightship are numbered, the stations have names. Light Vessel 101 was assigned to the stations:
 Charles, Cape Charles, Virginia (1916–1924)
 Relief, Relief 5th District (1925–1926)
 Overfalls, Overfalls, Delaware (1926–1951)
 Stonehorse, Stonehorse Shoal, Massachusetts (1951–1963)
 CrossRip, Cross Rip Shoal, Massachusetts (1963–1964)

Other lightships of Chesapeake Bay
 Lightship Chesapeake (LV-116)

See also
List of National Historic Landmarks in Virginia
National Register of Historic Places listings in Portsmouth, Virginia

References

External links
 
 Lightship Portsmouth
 Portsmouth Naval Shipyard Museum
 Chesapeake Bay Lighthouse Project - Lightship Portsmouth
 Lightship Overfalls

Museum ships in Virginia
Lightships of the United States
Ships of the United States Lighthouse Service
Ships built by Pusey and Jones
National Historic Landmarks in Virginia
Museums in Portsmouth, Virginia
National Historic Landmark lighthouses
National Register of Historic Places in Portsmouth, Virginia
Ships on the National Register of Historic Places in Virginia
1916 ships